Who's to Say What Stays the Same is the first extended play by Avail and their first release on vinyl in May 1991. The four songs that make up the album were taken from their second release, "Reaching Out" originally released on cassette in 1990.  The recording of this album took place during December 1989 at Inner Ear Studio.

Line up
Brien Stewart - vocals
Joe Banks -guitar
Tim Barry - drums
D.J. Grimes - bass

Track listing

References

1989 debut EPs
Avail EPs